Poverty Island is a small island in the U.S. state of Michigan. The island is within Delta County in Lake Michigan and is home to the Poverty Island Light Station,  an abandoned lighthouse which is in disrepair. Poverty Island is currently owned by the federal government.

Le Griffon
On June 16, 2013, U.S. and French archeologists began examining an underwater object first discovered in 2001 near Poverty Island that could be the wreck of Le Griffon, although it will take time to determine if it is even a shipwreck. Dean Anderson, the Michigan State Archeologist, examined the object, an alleged "bowsprit," and determined it to be a fishing net stake. Le Griffon was the first full-sized European style sailing ship on the upper Great Lakes that was built and commanded by the French explorer René-Robert Cavelier, Sieur de La Salle in 1679. The ship disappeared with all six crew members and its cargo of furs on its return trip of her maiden voyage that same year.  The location and reason of her sinking has remained a mystery ever since.

Other islands in the chain
(North to south)
Little Summer Island
Summer Island
 Poverty Island
Gull Island
St. Martin Island
Rock Island
Washington Island
Pilot Island
Detroit Island
Plum Island

External links
Beacons in the Night, Michigan Lighthouse Chronology, Clarke Historical Library, Central Michigan University.

Notes

Islands of Delta County, Michigan
Uninhabited islands of Michigan
Islands of Lake Michigan in Michigan